Xanthomonas campestris is  a bacterium that causes a variety of plant diseases, including "black rot" in cruciferous vegetables and bacterial wilt of turfgrass.

It is also used in the commercial production of xanthan gum, a high-molecular-weight polysaccharide which has many important uses, especially in the food industry.

Pathovars
(pv. means pathovar, a type of classification based on the host plant that is attacked by Xanthomonas campestris)
 Xanthomonas campestris pv. armoraciae
 Xanthomonas campestris pv. begoniae A
 Xanthomonas campestris pv. begoniae B
 Xanthomonas campestris pv. campestris
 Xanthomonas campestris pv. cannabis
 Xanthomonas campestris pv. carota
 Xanthomonas campestris pv. corylina
 Xanthomonas campestris pv. dieffenbachiae
 Xanthomonas campestris pv. glycines syn. Xanthomonas axonopodis pv. glycines
 Xanthomonas campestris pv. graminis
 Xanthomonas campestris pv. hederae
 Xanthomonas campestris pv. hyacinthi
 Xanthomonas campestris pv. juglandis – the walnut blight
 Xanthomonas campestris pv. malvacearum or Xanthomonas citri subsp. malvacearum
 Xanthomonas campestris pv. musacearum
 Xanthomonas campestris pv. mangiferaeindicae
 Xanthomonas campestris pv. mori
 Xanthomonas campestris pv. nigromaculans
 Xanthomonas campestris pv. pelargonii
 Xanthomonas campestris pv. phaseoli
 Xanthomonas campestris pv. poinsettiicola
 Xanthomonas pruni syn. X. campestris pv. pruni
 Xanthomonas campestris pv. raphani
 Xanthomonas campestris pv. sesami
 Xanthomonas campestris pv. tardicrescens
 Xanthomonas campestris pv. translucens
 Xanthomonas campestris pv. vesicatoria
  Xanthomonas campestris pv. viticola
The former X. c. pv. citri, which causes citrus canker, was reclassified as X. axonopodis in 1995. In 2006, the species designations for X. c. pv. citri and X. c. pv. malvacearum were revised to xes. citri and these pathovars are now referred to as subspecies.

References

Further reading
 Gerhard Reuther, Martin Bahmann: Elimination of Xanthomonas campestris pv. pelargonii by Means of Micropropagation of Pelargonium Stock Plants; In: 3rd International Geranium Conference, 1992. Proceedings, Ball Publishing Batavia, IL. USA; (1992),
 Schaad NW, Postnikova E, Lacy GH, Sechler A, Agarkova I, Stromberg PE, Stromberg VK, Vidaver AK (2006). "Emended classification of xanthomonad pathogens on citrus." Syst Appl Microbiol 29(8): 690–695.
 Vauterin L, Hoste B, Kersters K, and Swings J (1995). "Reclassification of Xanthomonas." Int J Syst Bacteriol 45: 472–489.
 Maji MD, Qadri MH, Pal SC (1998). "Xanthomonas campestris pv. mori, a new bacterial pathogen of mulberry." Sericologia 38(3): 519–522.

External links
 Type strain of Xanthomonas campestris at BacDive -  the Bacterial Diversity Metadatabase

Xanthomonadales
Bacterial plant pathogens and diseases
Soybean diseases